Merlin Diamond (born 1991) is a Namibian sprinter. She won the 100 metres and 200 metres at the 2010 National Athletic Championships, Namibia.

She is one of the five Namibian athletes to win a bursary from Olympic Solidarity, the International Olympic Council's development fund. She

Merlin's dream
To be the first Namibian to bring to bring a gold medal home

References

1991 births
Living people
Namibian female sprinters
20th-century Namibian women
21st-century Namibian women